Commander, U.S. Fleet Forces Command (COMUSFF/COMFLTFORCOM) is the title of the United States Navy officer who serves as the commanding officer of the United States Fleet Forces Command. The U.S. Fleet Forces Command was originally established in 1905 as the U.S. Atlantic Fleet and as a two-star rear admiral's billet; the position has been held by a four-star admiral since March 10, 1915. The 45th, and current, commander of U.S. Fleet Forces Command is Admiral Daryl L. Caudle.

Title's history

The first Commander-in-Chief of the Atlantic Fleet was Rear Admiral Robley D. Evans, who assumed command on January 1, 1906 aboard his flagship the battleship .

The title, Commander-in-Chief, U.S. Atlantic Fleet, was continuously used from 1906 until 1923 and again from 1941 to 2002. In a reorganization of the United States Fleet in 1923, that title was abolished and the title Commander Scouting Force was used. On February 1, 1941, General Order 143 reestablished the title and reorganized the United States Fleet into three separate fleets: the U.S. Atlantic Fleet, the U.S. Pacific Fleet and the U.S. Asiatic Fleet. The order further stated each fleet would be under the command of a four-star admiral. Thus, on February 1, 1941, Rear Admiral Ernest J. King, in his flagship  at Culebra, Puerto Rico, hauled down his two-star flag and hoisted his four-star flag as Commander-in-Chief, U.S. Atlantic Fleet.

After the end of World War II, the organization of the United States armed forces was reviewed with a view toward reorganization after the turbulent war years. On December 1, 1947, under a reorganization act of the armed forces approved by Congress, the unified combatant command, United States Atlantic Command, was established with headquarters co-located to those of the U.S. Atlantic Fleet. Admiral William H.P. Blandy was given the dual-hatted command of both U.S. Atlantic Fleet and U.S. Atlantic Command thus becoming the Commander-in-Chief, U.S. Atlantic Fleet and the first Commander-in-Chief, U.S. Atlantic Command. The two titles remained linked until another reorganization of the armed forces, via the Goldwater-Nichols Act in 1985, separated the U.S. Atlantic Command from the U.S. Atlantic Fleet.

In the early 1950s, the North Atlantic Treaty Organization (NATO) decided to establish a new major command, Allied Command Atlantic, under the command of a U.S. four-star admiral with headquarters in Norfolk, VA. Since this was primarily a naval command responsible for allied defense of the North Atlantic, the decision was made to co-locate this organization with that of the U.S. Atlantic Command and U.S. Atlantic Fleet, to form a triple-hatted command. On April 10, 1952, Admiral Lynde D. McCormick, the Commander-in-Chief, U.S. Atlantic Command and U.S. Atlantic Fleet, assumed the additional title as the first Supreme Allied Commander Atlantic. Like the U.S. Atlantic Command, the Allied Command Atlantic remained intact and part of a triple-hatted command organization until the Goldwater-Nichols Act occurred in 1985. The Goldwater-Nichols Act separated command of the U.S. Atlantic Fleet from the other two commands giving the U.S. Atlantic Fleet its own four-star admiral. Admiral Wesley L. McDonald was the last U.S. Navy admiral to command all three organizations at the same time. He relinquished command of the U.S. Atlantic Fleet to Admiral Carlisle A. H. Trost on October 4, 1985.

However, under the Goldwater-Nichols Act, the admiral filling the post of Commander-in-Chief, U.S. Atlantic Fleet, would also serve as the Deputy Commander-in-Chief, U.S. Atlantic Command. This role for CINCLANTFLT continued until 1986 when the Secretary of Defense approved a separate billet for the Deputy Commander-in-Chief, U.S. Atlantic Command. On September 16, 1986, Admiral Frank B. Kelso II relinquished the Deputy USCINCLANT post to Major General Thomas G. Darling, USAF.

On October 1, 2001, the Chief of Naval Operations designated the CINCLANTFLT to concurrently serve as Commander, U.S. Fleet Forces Command. U.S. Fleet Forces Command became responsible for overall coordination, establishment, and implementation of integrated requirements and policies for manning, equipping, and training Atlantic and Pacific Fleet units during the inter-deployment training cycle.

On October 24, 2002, Secretary of Defense Donald Rumsfeld directed that the title of "Commander-in-Chief" be reserved solely for the President of the United States. In a message to Naval Commanders-in-Chief, the Chief of Naval Operations directed a change of title to that of "Commander." This change affected the U.S. Atlantic Fleet, U.S. Pacific Fleet, and U.S. Naval Forces Europe thus renaming Commander-in-Chief, U.S. Atlantic Fleet to Commander, U.S. Atlantic Fleet.

On May 23, 2006, the Chief of Naval Operations ordered the assimilation of U.S. Atlantic Fleet into U.S. Fleet Forces Command and that the dual-hatted position be integrated to its current title of Commander, U.S. Fleet Forces Command.

On October 31, 2006, a ceremony was held to officially mark the transition of the U.S. Atlantic Fleet and U.S. Fleet Forces Command to just U.S. Fleet Forces Command. Three of the 37 previous admirals who held the top post in the Atlantic fleet attended the ceremony, which was held aboard the aircraft carrier .

Appointment
The Commander, U.S. Fleet Forces Command is nominated by the President for appointment from any eligible officers holding the rank of rear admiral (lower half) or above, who also meets the requirements for the position, under the advice and/or recommendation of the Secretary of the Navy, the Chief of Naval Operations, and if applicable the Chairman of the Joint Chiefs of Staff. The nominee must be confirmed via majority vote by the Senate. For the Navy, flag officer tours are usually limited to two years.

List of commanders

See also
Commander, U.S. Pacific Fleet

References

External links
U.S. Fleet Forces Command official website
List of U.S. Fleet Forces Command commanders

Commander, U.S. Fleet